Nasocorini is a tribe of plant bugs in the family Miridae. There are more than 50 genera in Nasocorini.

Genera
These 59 genera belong to the tribe Nasocorini:

 Adenostomocoris Schuh & Schwartz, 2004 - Southwest Nearctic
 Agrametra Buchanan-White, 1878 - St. Helena Island
 Arctostaphylocoris Schuh & Schwartz, 2004 - Western Nearctic
 Atomophora Reuter, 1879 - Palearctic
 Atomoscelis Reuter, 1875 - Palearctic
 Atractotomoidea Yasunaga, 1999 - southern and eastern Asia
 Atractotomus Fieber, 1858 - Holarctic
 Badezorus Distant, 1910 - Palearctic
 Beckocoris Knight, 1968 - Western Nearctic
 Bergmiris Carvalho, 1984 - Neotropics
 Boopidocoris Reuter, 1879 - Palearctic
 Caiganga Carvalho & Becker, 1957 - Neotropics
 Camptotylidea Wagner, 1957 - Palearctic
 Campylomma Reuter, 1878 - Old World, Australia
 Chinacapsus Wagner, 1961 - Palearctic
 Chlamydatus Curtis, 1833 - Holarctic
 Chlamyopsallus Schwartz, 2005 - Western Nearctic
 Hambletoniola Carvalho, 1954 - Western Nearctic
 Helenocoris Schmitz, 1976 - St. Helena Island
 Hirtopsallus Schmitz, 1976 - St. Helena Island
 Insulopus Schmitz, 1976 - St. Helena Island
 Karocris V. Putshkov, 1975 - Palearctic
 Kasumiphylus Schwartz & Stonedahl, 2004 - Palearctic
 Knightomiroides Stonedahl & Schwartz, 1996 - Western Nearctic
 Lamprosthenarus Poppius, 1914 - Africa
 Larinocerus Froeschner, 1965 - Western Nearctic
 Lattinophylus Schuh, 2008 - Western Nearctic
 Lindbergopsallus Wagner, 1962 - Palearctic
 Lopsallus Schmitz, 1976 - St. Helena Island
 Maurodactylus Reuter, 1878 - Palearctic
 Megalopsallus Knight, 1927 - Nearctic
 Monosynamma J. Scott, 1864 - Holarctic
 Naresthus Schmitz, 1976 - St. Helena Island
 Nasocoris Reuter, 1879 - Palearctic
 Neisopsallus Schmitz, 1976 - St. Helena Island
 Neophylus Carvalho & Costa, 1992 - Nearctic
 Nevadocoris Knight, 1968 - Western Nearctic
 Nigrimiris Carvalho & Schaffner, 1973 - Neotropics
 Nigrocapillocoris Wagner, 1973 - Palearctic
 Oligobiella Reuter, 1885 - St. Helena Island
 Orthopidea Reuter, 1899 - Palearctic
 Phaxia Kerzhner, 1984 - Palearctic
 Phoenicocoris Reuter, 1875 - Holarctic
 Pinomiris Stonedahl & Schwartz, 1996 - Western Nearctic
 Pruneocoris Schuh & Schwartz, 2004 - Western Nearctic
 Psallomimus Wagner, 1951 - Africa, southern Palearctic
 Rhinacloa Reuter, 1876 - Neotropics, Mexico
 Salicarus Kerzhner, 1962 - Palearctic
 Solenoxyphus Reuter, 1875 - Palearctic
 Spanagonicus Berg, 1883 - New World
 Squamophylus Carvalho & Costa, 1992 - Nearctic
 Sthenaropsis Poppius, 1912 - Palearctic
 Taeniophorus Linnavuori, 1952 - Palearctic
 Tannerocoris Knight, 1970 - Western Nearctic
 Tapuruyunus Carvalho, 1946 - Neotropics
 Thymopsallus Linnavuori, 1975 - Palearctic
 Tijucaphylus Carvalho & Costa, 1992 - Neotropics
 Tunisiella Carapezza, 1997 - Palearctic
 Voruchia Reuter, 1879 - Palearctic

References

Phylinae